Wayne Richard Bianchin (born September 6, 1953) is a Canadian-born Italian former professional ice hockey Left Winger. He played in the National Hockey League for the Pittsburgh Penguins and Edmonton Oilers between 1973 and 1980. Internationally Bianchin played for the Italian national team at the 1981 World Championship B Pool.

Career
After scoring 60 goals in 68 games with the WCJHL's Flin Flon Bombers in 1972–73, Bianchin was selected 23rd overall by the Pittsburgh Penguins at the 1973 NHL Amateur Draft. He recorded 25 points his rookie year, but suffered a broken neck while body surfing during the offseason. He spent the next season split between the AHL and NHL while recovering. He suffered his 2nd back surgery and was left unprotected on the NHL Intra League Draft. His best season came in 1976-77 when he played 79 games for the Penguins and scored 28 goals; he also appeared in the playoffs for the only time of his career. The Edmonton Oilers acquired Bianchin in the 1979 NHL Expansion Draft but he would serve just eleven games with them due to a nagging back. He chose to play a reduced schedule and played two seasons in Italy with HC Asiago and AS Mastini Varese. He was a member of the Italian national team at the Group B World Championships in 1981 and lead the tournament with scoring and was selected to the First Line All-Star Team.

Family
His son, Jordan Bianchin, played professional hockey for three seasons in the Central Hockey League and in Italy's Serie A.

Career statistics

Regular season and playoffs

International

Awards and achievements
WEC-B All-Star Team (1981)

References

External links

1953 births
Living people
Canadian expatriate ice hockey players in Italy
Canadian expatriate ice hockey players in the United States
Canadian sportspeople of Italian descent
Asiago Hockey 1935 players
Calgary Centennials players
Canadian ice hockey left wingers
Italian ice hockey players
Edmonton Oilers players
Flin Flon Bombers players
HC Varese players
Hershey Bears players
Houston Apollos players
Ice hockey people from British Columbia
Johnstown Jets players
Kamloops Rockets players
Pittsburgh Penguins draft picks
Pittsburgh Penguins players
Sportspeople from Nanaimo
Victoria Cougars (WHL) players